Pleasant Ridge Township may refer to:

 Pleasant Ridge Township, Fulton County, Arkansas, in Fulton County, Arkansas
 Pleasant Ridge Township, Livingston County, Illinois
 Pleasant Ridge Township, Lee County, Iowa
 Pleasant Ridge Township, Pawnee County, Kansas, in Pawnee County, Kansas
 Pleasant Ridge Township, Barry County, Missouri
 Pleasant Ridge Township, Corson County, South Dakota, in Corson County, South Dakota

Township name disambiguation pages